= Ellenic Vehicle Research Ltd. =

Automotive development company in Cyprus

Ellenic Vehicle Research Ltd
- Founded: 1990s
- Founder: Dr Dimitrios Hatzikakidis
- Headquarters: Cyprus

Ellenic Vehicle Research Ltd (also using the Elenica brand name) is an automotive development company registered in Cyprus and founded by Greek engineer Dr Dimitrios Hatzikakidis. Elenica has been developing the MSCC (Modular Sports Car Concept) family of vehicles, utilizing Dr. Hatzikakidis’s proposed (and patented) Parametric Chassis Technology, as part of the high-end application of this technology.

The particular technology proposal originated in the late 1990s, and utilized the concept of connected “suspension modules”, which, according to the company, can lead to lighter, more structurally rigid, and cheaper to produce vehicles. Seven rolling prototypes have been produced and are being tested, while complete functioning prototypes are currently being built in Switzerland and the U.K. The Modular Sports Car Concept has received significant publicity in Greek media, and was presented at the Hellenic Motor Museum in Athens, Greece, in June 2014.
